Hasmawi Hassan (born 4 August 1980) is a former Malaysian footballer.

Club career
Known as "Mawi" by fans, the Penang-born striker was one of top player at Penang FA since drafted to senior team in the 1998 season. While at Penang, he helps the team win Premier 1 championship in 1998 and 2001, Malaysia FA Cup in 2002 and Malaysia Charity Shield in 2003. After playing several season with his hometown team, he signed with Kedah FA in 2004 and was an instrumental figure in helping Kedah win the 'double treble' championship (League, FA Cup and Malaysia Cup) in 2007 and 2008. He was the first starter in Kedah's line-up for the majority of his career there until the emergence of Kedah youngster Mohd Khyril Muhymeen Zambri taking over his place at the end of his stay in Kedah.

For the 2009 season, he was released by Kedah FA and later signed with Premier League Malaysia outfit, Felda United FC for a season contract. He later was signed by Negeri Sembilan FA to play in the 2011 Super League Malaysia. He returned to Penang in 2012.

International career
He received several call-ups with Malaysia national football team, appearing 3 times for them, one of the match was against Brazil national football team in 2002. He also represents Malaysia U-21 for the Afro-Asian Games Hyderabad, India in October 2003.

Honours

Penang FA
 Malaysia Premier 1 League (2): 1998, 2001
 Malaysia FA Cup (1): 2002
 Malaysia Charity Shield (1): 2003

Kedah FA
 Malaysia Premier League (1) : 2006
 Malaysia Cup (2) : 2007, 2008
 Malaysia FA Cup (2) : 2007, 2008
 Malaysia Super League (2) : 2007, 2008

Felda United FC
 Malaysia Premier League (1) : 2010

Negeri Sembilan FA
 Malaysia Cup (1) : 2011

References

1980 births
Malaysian people of Malay descent
Malaysian footballers
Malaysia international footballers
Living people
Penang F.C. players
People from Penang
Footballers at the 2002 Asian Games
Association football forwards
Asian Games competitors for Malaysia

External links
 Hasmawi Hassan at Soccerway
 Hasmawi Hassan Permata Bola Sepak Malaysia at Kedah Ke KL

Negeri Sembilan FA players